The Ariel Award for Best Actress (Spanish: Premio Ariel a Mejor Actriz) is an award presented by the Academia Mexicana de Artes y Ciencias Cinematográficas (AMACC) in Mexico. It is given in honor of an actress who has delivered an outstanding performance in a leading role while working within the Mexican film industry. In 1947, the 1st and 2nd Ariel Awards were held, with Dolores del Río and María Félix winning for the films Las Abandonadas and Enamorada, respectively. With the exception of the years 1959 to 1971, when the Ariel Awards were suspended, the award has been given annually. Nominees and winners are determined by a committee formed every year consisting of academy members (active and honorary), previous winners and individuals with at least two Ariel nominations; the committee members submit their votes through the official AMACC website.

Since its inception, the award has been given to 50 actresses. Blanca Guerra is the most awarded performer, with four accolades; Del Río, Félix, and María Rojo had received three Ariels, each; while Irene Azuela, Mónica del Carmen, Marga López, Silvia Pinal, Patricia Reyes Spíndola and Adriana Roel, had been awarded twice. Rojo is the most nominated performer, with eight nominations. The category has resulted in a tie on four occasions: Guerra and Norma Herrera (1980), Guerra and Rojo (1988), Ximena Ayala and Ana Bertha Espín (2001), and Elizabeth Cervantes and Maribel Verdú (2007). In two instances an actress has been nominated twice the same year: in 1983, Rojo was nominated for La Pachanga and La Víspera, and lost the award to Beatriz Sheridan for Confidencias; and at the 38th Ariel Awards, Patricia Reyes Spíndola was nominated twice in the category for La Reina de la Noche and Mujeres Insumisas, and won for the former film. In 1984, Isela Vega won for La Viuda Negra, filmed in 1977 and censored seven years because of its content.

Nine films have featured two nominated performances for Best Actress, the episode "Nosotros" from the anthology film Tú, Yo, Nosotros (Julissa and Rita Macedo), De Todos Modos Juan Te Llamas (Patricia Aspillaga and Rocío Brambila), Naufragio (Ana Ofelia Murguía and María Rojo), Veneno Para Las Hadas (Elsa María Gutiérrez and Ana Patricia Rojo), Como Agua Para Chocolate (Lumi Cavazos and Regina Torné), Principio y Fin (Julieta Egurrola and Lucía Muñoz), Novia Que Te Vea (Claudette Maillé and Maya Mishalska), El Callejón de los Milagros (Salma Hayek and Margarita Sanz), and Nicotina (Rosa María Bianchi and Carmen Madrid); Macedo, Brambila, Rojo, Torné, Muñoz, Sanz and Bianchi won the award. 14 performers have won both the Ariel Award for Best Actress and the accolade for Best Supporting Actress; Margarita Sanz and Patricia Reyes Spíndola had received the aforementioned awards and the Ariel for Best Actress in a Minor Role. Ana Ofelia Murguía is the most nominated actress without a win, with five unsuccessful nominations. As of the 2022 ceremony, Mónica del Carmen is the most recent winner in this category for her role in Una Película de Policías.

Winners and nominees

Multiple wins and nominations 

The following individuals have received multiple Best Actress awards:

The following actresses received four or more Best Actress nominations:

See also 
 Academy Award for Best Actress
 Best Actress Award (Cannes Film Festival)

References

Ariel Awards
Film awards for lead actress